Nasiriyah Stadium (Arabic: ملعب الناصرية الدولي), also known as Dhi Qar Sports Complex, is a football stadium currently under construction in Nasiriyah, Iraq. It will primarily serve as the new home stadium of Al-Nasiriya FC. The stadium will have a capacity of 30,000 spectators. The net construction cost is estimated around 95 million USD funded entirely by Iraqi government. Construction is currently on hold.

Overview
In 2013, the Iraqi government presented the project for a new stadium in Dhi Qar, in the south of the country, with a design signed by the French architecture firm of Bechu & Associés in collaboration with Alain-Charles Perrot. The project includes a main stadium with a capacity of 30,000 spectators, two training stadiums seating 2,500 and 500 people respectively, a four-star hotel with 80 rooms and two sports pavilions (aquatic center and sports hall). The entire complex complies with FIFA standards.

The project that started in 2013 was supposed to be delivered in two and a half years, but seven years later, only 75% of the stadium was complete.

In January 2022, faced with the delays, the Iraqi government decides to terminate all contracts with the French companies in charge of the work.

See also
List of football stadiums in Iraq
List of future stadiums
Football in Iraq

References

Football venues in Iraq
Stadiums under construction